Mount Kilak is a mountain in Amuru District, Uganda.

The mountain range is located along the Uganda-Sudan border and serves as a natural boundary, which has influenced the socio-political differences between the Acholi in Uganda and  the Acholi in the Sudan.

Mount Kilak
Mountains of Uganda